The Villagómez family is a Mixtec noble family, who were among the largest landowners in New Spain, later Mexico. Despite being part of the colonial elite, the Villagómez retained their Mixtec identity, speaking the Mixtec language and keeping a collection of Mixtec codices.

See also
 Mexican nobility

References

Mexican nobility
Mixtec people
Mexican people of indigenous peoples descent
Mexican noble families
Noble families
Mexican families